Rene Gamarcha Herrera (born April 24, 1979) is a Filipino track and field athlete. In total he has won 5 gold medals at South East Asian games. Currently, Herrera is one of the newly appointed coaches of the Philippines national athletics team.

Early life
Herrera was born and raised in Jordan, Guimaras.  He is the son of Rodrigo Herrera, an establishment janitor, and Nenita, a former housekeeper. 
Herrera started running at high school although, for a time, he was primarily an amateur boxer, competing in that event until the age 17.  He stopped boxing with a record of 20 fights and 5 loses. Subsequently, Herrera entered the annual Milo marathon that he won, enabling him to qualify for national competitions.

Herrera is a Philippine Navy seaman, 2nd class and has competed in Southeast Asian, Asian and Olympic Games.

Career

2012 Summer Olympics

In 2012 London Olympic Games, Herrera made his Olympics racing debut in the 5000 metres.  He qualified for the Olympics after winning silver at the Hong Kong Intercity Athletics Championships and becoming a five time gold medalist for the Southeast Asian games.

He was the oldest competitor for the Philippines at the Olympics

On August 8, 2012 in Olympic stadium, Herrera finished in 41st place, in a time of 14:44.11, his personal’s best in the 5000 metres.  However, Herrera did not advance at heats to the finals.

Achievements
Herrera competes in the 3000 meter Steeplechase and Marathon events.

Personal Bests

Competition record

Notes:
NR - National Record
PB - Personals best
NR - National Record
SB - Seasonal Best

See also
SEA Games
Steeplechase (athletics)

References

1979 births
Living people
Filipino male long-distance runners
Athletes (track and field) at the 2012 Summer Olympics
Olympic track and field athletes of the Philippines
Athletes (track and field) at the 2006 Asian Games
Athletes (track and field) at the 2010 Asian Games
Sportspeople from Guimaras
Filipino male steeplechase runners
Southeast Asian Games medalists in athletics
Southeast Asian Games gold medalists for the Philippines
Southeast Asian Games competitors for the Philippines
Competitors at the 2003 Southeast Asian Games
Competitors at the 2005 Southeast Asian Games
Competitors at the 2007 Southeast Asian Games
Competitors at the 2009 Southeast Asian Games
Competitors at the 2011 Southeast Asian Games
Asian Games competitors for the Philippines